Latipalpis is a genus of beetles in the family Buprestidae, containing the following species:

 Latipalpis cypria Niehuis, 2005
 Latipalpis johanidesi Niehuis, 2002
 Latipalpis margotana Novak, 1990
 Latipalpis persica Bily, 1980
 Latipalpis plana (Olivier, 1790)
 Latipalpis plasoni (Reitter, 1888)
 Latipalpis stellio Kiesenwetter, 1857

References

Buprestidae genera